Odostomia fehrae is a species of sea snail, a marine gastropod mollusc in the family Pyramidellidae, the pyrams and their allies.

Description
The size of the shell ranges from 1.7 mm to 1.9 mm.

Distribution
This species occurs in the following locations:
 European waters (ERMS scope)
 Southeast North Atlantic Ocean
 Azores.

Notes
Additional information regarding this species:
 Habitat: Known from seamounts and knolls

References

 Van Aartsen, J.J.; Gittenberger, E.; Goud, J. (1998). Pyramidellidae (Mollusca, Gastropoda, Heterobranchia) collected during the Dutch CANCAP and MAURITANIA expeditions in the south-eastern part of the North Atlantic Ocean (part 1) Zool. Verh. 321: 3-57

External links
 
 To CLEMAM
 To Encyclopedia of Life
 To World Register of Marine Species

fehrae
Gastropods described in 1998
Molluscs of the Atlantic Ocean